AFP Provida or Administradora de Fondos de Pensiones Provida (English: Pension Fund Administrator Provida) is the pension fund manager leader in the Chilean Pension Fund.

It was founded in 1981 under the eaves of Decree Law 3.500 in Chile launched a modern private pension system with the growing 59 branches nationwide, replicated in 10 years in Latin America countries (such as Mexico, Ecuador and Dominican Republic) and also in Eastern Europe.

In 1999, AFP Provida was purchased by Spanish financial group BBVA with a whole sale of $1.54 billion.

In 2013, MetLife purchased BBVA's 64.3% stake in AFP Provida  for approximately $1.54 billion.

References

Companies listed on the New York Stock Exchange
Financial services companies of Chile
Chilean companies established in 1981
Financial services companies established in 1981